A.S. Fiumicino 1926, formerly known as Fiumicino Calcio, is an Italian football club, based in Fiumicino, a suburb of Greater Rome in the Metropolitan City of Rome Capital (formerly Province of Rome). The club participated in Serie D and Eccellenza Lazio several times, but as of 2018–19 season, participating in Promozione Lazio Group C. The club also affiliated to A.S. Roma as a feeder club.

History
Fiumicino Calcio was founded in 1926 in Fiumicino, at that time part of Rome comune as Fiumicino (XXXVII) of Circoscrizione XIV of Rome. Fiumicino comune was created in 1992. The registration number of the club was 76,297. The club was the founding member of Eccellenza Lazio, the new 6th highest level in 1991. The club played in Promozione Lazio from 1981 to 1991, at that time the 6th highest level. Eccellenza and Promozione became the 5th and 6th level in 2014, after the disestablishment of Lega Pro Seconda Divisione.

Fiumicino won Eccellenza Lazio in 1993 and again 1996. The club played in Campionato Nazionale Dilettanti (Serie D) from 1993 to 1996 and again from 1996 to 1998. Fiumicino was relegated again in  season, with only 20 points. Thus, in 2012–13 season, Fiumicino had derbies with namesake Città di Fiumicino. In 2012–13 Promozione Lazio season, Città di Fiumicino finished as the 8th, and Fiumicino was relegated again as the 18th.

In 2015, Fiumicino merged with another minor club of the comune, "A.S.D. Isola Sacra 2011" (namesake of Isola Sacra). The new denomination was A.S. Fiumicino 1926, with a new registration number 943,007.

Stadium
The club played their home matches in Stadio Pietro Desideri, on 2 Via Balsofiore, Fiumicino. The stadium was also used by Lupa Roma. The stadium had a capacity of 2,500.

Honours
 Eccellenza Lazio
 Winners (2): ,

See also
 Pol.D. Fregene, another team of Fiumicino comune, but from Fregene area, a predecessor of A.S.D. S.F.F. Atletico
 A.S.D. Maccarese Calcio, another team of Fiumicino comune, but from Maccarese area
 A.S.D. S.F.F. Atletico, another team of Fiumicino comune

References

External links
  

Football clubs in Italy
Football clubs in Lazio
Sport in Fiumicino
Association football clubs established in 1926
1926 establishments in Italy